Pietro Marcellino Corradini (2 June 1658 - 8 February 1743) was an Italian Roman Catholic cardinal. Corradini served in various departments of the Roman Curia under several popes and founded the Collegine Sisters of the Holy Family as a response to the demand for religious instruction for girls.

In 1993 his cause for sainthood was opened in Palermo and he became titled as a Servant of God. Pope Francis named him as Venerable on 24 April 2021.

Life
Pietro Marcellino Corradini was born to bourgeois parents on 2 June 1658 in Sezze to Torquato Corradini and Porzia Ciammarucone. He was baptized on 3 June and his godmother was Caterina Savelli. He was educated at home and was later sent to Rome where he earned a doctorate in "utroque iure" both civil and canon law. He also underwent archaeological studies.

Corradini later became the auditor to Cardinal Benedetto Pamphilj in 1685 and was later exposed to the Roman Curia where he held a post he was reconfirmed in under Pope Clement XI on 7 December 1700 (as is the norm after the elevation of a new pope). Pope Innocent XII - in 1699 - appointed him as a canon of the Basilica of Saint John Lateran despite the fact that he had not been ordained to the priesthood at that stage. He was ordained as a priest in Rome on 10 June 1702 and was appointed as a member of the Apostolic Signatura in mid 1706. Cardinal Leandro Colloredo named him as a canonist and auditor in 1706 for the Apostolic Penitentiary also in 1706 and was confirmed as such in a papal bull on 19 August 1706.

Corradini was appointed as the Titular Archbishop of Atens on 7 November 1707 which warranted his episcopal consecration. He was also made a monsignor on 23 November 1707 prior to his consecration; Cardinal Fabrizio Paolucci consecrated him on 27 November 1707 in the Basilica of Saint John Lateran.

During the years 1705-1711 the jurist defends of the papacy against various political and military interference on the part of Joseph I of Austria, who pursues continuous retaliation and arbitrary acts against the papal States. He also successfully opposed the empero's attempt to impose as bishop of Hildesheim (without the approval of Pope Clement XI) his favorite Hugh Francis Fustenberg.

Pope Clement XI reserved Corradini as a cardinal in pectore in mid 1712 and revealed his name (therefore his status as cardinal took effect) on 26 September 1712 and received the red hat and status as Cardinal-Priest of San Giovanni a Porta Latina on 21 November 1712. The pope also appointed Corradini as the Pro-Prefect of the Congregation of the Council in April 1718 and as its full prefect on 26 November 1718 until 1721. He also held the post of Camerlengo from 1719 until 4 March 1720.

He participated in the papal conclave of 1721 that saw the election of Pope Innocent XIII and also served as an elector in the papal conclave of 1724 that saw the election of Pope Benedict XIII. Around this time on 11 September 1726 the pope allowed for Corradini to hold his titular church "in commendam" with the status of being the Cardinal-Priest of Santa Maria in Trastevere. He also participated in the conclave of 1730 that saw the election of Pope Clement XII and declined the pope's offer of reconfirmation in his work in the Apostolic Dataria; this meant an end to his work in the completion of treaties with Spain and Austria. In 1717 he established a religious order that was devoted to the education of girls in religious education. On 10 April 1734 he resigned as Cardinal-Priest of San Giovanni a Porta Latina and opted for the Roman diocese of Frascati as a Cardinal-Bishop on 15 December 1734. In the conclave of 1740 Cardinal Troiano Acquaviva d'Aragon presented the veto of King Felipe V against Corradini; the conclave resulted in the election of Pope Benedict XIV.

Corradini died at 11:45am on 8 February 1743 after a long and protracted illness in Rome in Via Lata. His remains were moved to Santa Maria in Trastevere, in accordance with his will, on the following 10 February, prompting an outpouring of grief and condolence messages.

Legacy
At present, Corradini's religious congregation has spread across the world and now operates in Albania, the United Kingdom, Mexico, Romania, Tanzania and in Kenya.

Beatification process

The beatification process commenced on 30 October 1992 under Pope John Paul II with the declaration of "nihil obstat" (nothing against) for the cause. It was opened in 1993 in a Mass that Cardinal Salvatore Pappalardo presided over and it concluded its business on 17 October 1999 in a Mass that Cardinal Salvatore De Giorgi celebrated which acted as the formal conclusion. The Congregation for the Causes of Saints validated the diocesan process on 16 March 2001.

Pope Francis named him as Venerable on 24 April 2021.

The postulator assigned to the cause is Father Paolo Lombardo O.F.M.

References

External links
Hagiography Circle

1658 births
1743 deaths
17th-century venerated Christians
18th-century venerated Christians
Clergy from Rome
Founders of Catholic religious communities
18th-century Italian cardinals
18th-century Italian Roman Catholic archbishops
Venerated Catholics by Pope Francis